APK may refer to:

Science
 Adenylyl-sulfate kinase
 Amplitude and phase-shift keying
 Android application package file format
 apk-tools, the package manager of Alpine Linux
 Aspartokinase, especially lysC

Other uses
 Afrikaanse Protestantse Kerk, Calvinist church in South Africa
 Algemene Periodieke Keuring, the vehicle inspection procedure in the Netherlands
 Alliance Party of Kenya, a political party established in 2012
 Apopka High School, Florida
 Arbetarpartiet Kommunisterna, the Swedish name for the Communist Party of Sweden (1995)
 Arbejderpartiet Kommunisterne, the Danish name for the Workers' Communist Party (Denmark)
 Air Peace (ICAO airline code)